2009–10  was a season of Beta Ethniki, the Greek professional football second division (see Greek football league system).

Overview
Atromitos, PAS Giannina and Kavala have earned the promotion to Super League Greece, while Kastoria, Kallithea and Veria relegated to Gamma Ethniki (see 2008–09 Beta Ethniki).
Thrasyvoulos, Panserraikos and OFI will compete in Beta Ethniki this season after being relegated from the Super League in 2008–09.
Doxa Drama and Ilioupoli will compete in Beta Ethniki this season after earning promotion from Gamma Ethniki in 2008–09. Ilisiakos merged with Egaleo, which was relegated to Delta Ethniki in 2008–2009 season and renamed as Egaleo in August 2009.
Panetolikos earned promotion from Gamma Ethniki by beating Rodos in Gamma Ethniki promotion play-offs.
Rodos earned promotion from Gamma Ethniki by qualifying for the Gamma Ethniki play-offs and replacing the suspended Apollon Kalamarias.

League table

Results

Play-offs
Starting from this season,a play-off group will be held between the teams which finished in positions 3-6 for the last promotion spot, and a play-out group between the teams which finished in positions 13-16 for the last relegation spot.

The same system which is used to the European play-off of First Division (see Super League Greece) will be applied. The play-off and play-out of Second Division (Football League). Teams play each other in a home and away round robin. However, they do not all start with 0 points. Instead, a weighting system applies to the teams' standing at the start of the play-off mini-league. The team finishing sixth in the Football League will start the play-off with 0 points. The sixth placed team's end of season tally of points is subtracted from the sum of the points that other teams have. The only difference with European play-off of Super League is that this number is then divided by four (instead to five in Super League), to give the other teams the points with which they start the mini-league. If necessary, points will be rounded.

As a result, the teams will start the promotional play-offs with the following number of points:

 OFI – 3 points ((62–50) / 4 ) 
 Ethikos Peiraeus – 1 point ((53–50) / 4 = 0.75, rounded to 1) 
 Panserraikos– 1 point ((52–50) / 4 = 0.5, rounded to 1) 
 Pierikos – 0 points ((50–50) / 4 = 0)

Also, the teams will start the relegation play-offs with the following number of points:

 Thrasyvoulos - 2 points ((41-34) / 4 = 1.75, rounded to 2)
 Doxa Dramas - 2 points ((40-34) / 4 = 1.5, rounded to 2)
 Ionikos - 1 point ((39-34) / 4=1.25, rounded to 1)
 Rodos - 0 points ((34–34) / 4 = 0)

Promotion play-offs

Relegation play-offs

Top scorers

References

Second level Greek football league seasons
Greece
2